The Royal Siamese Armed Forces (Thai: กองทัพหลวง) were the armed forces of the Thai monarchy from the 12th to 19th centuries. The term refers to the military forces of the Sukhothai Kingdom, the Ayutthaya Kingdom, the Thonburi Kingdom and the Early Rattanakosin Kingdom in chronological order. The army was one of the major military forces of Southeast Asia. With a reform into a new Western-style army in 1852, the Royal Siamese Army became a new European-trained military force.

The Royal Thai Armed Forces are the contemporary military of Thailand.

Organization
The Royal Siamese Army was organized into three general tiers: the Palace Guards, the Capital Defense Corps, and the field levies. Only the first two were the standing military. They protected the sovereign and the capital region, and formed the nucleus of the armed forces in wartime. The third, the field levies or conscripts, were usually raised just prior to or during wartime, and provided manpower to resist attacks and project power beyond the boundaries of the empire. Most of the field levy served in the infantry but the men for the elephantry, cavalry, artillery and naval corps were drawn from specific hereditary villages that specialized in respective military skills.

Special branches
The infantry was the backbone of the wartime Siamese army, and was supported by special branches—the elephantry, cavalry, artillery, and naval corps. These special branches were formed by the men from certain hereditary villages that provided the men with specialized skills. In a typical Ayutthaya or Rattanakosin formation, a 1000-strong infantry regiment was supported by 100 horses and 10 war elephants.

Elephantry
The main use of war elephants was to charge the enemy, trampling them and breaking their ranks. Although the elephantry units made up only about one percent of the overall strength, they were a major component of Siamese war strategy throughout the imperial era. The army on the march would bring expert catchers of wild elephants.

Cavalry
From the 17th century onward, cavalry troops made up about 10% of a typical regiment. The men of the cavalry were drawn mainly from hereditary villages.

Artillery
During the 16th century, the Siamese artillery and musketeer corps were originally made up exclusively of foreign (European and Muslim) mercenaries.

Navy

The naval arm of the army consisted mainly of river-faring war boats. Its primary missions were to control the Chao Phraya River, and to protect the ships carrying the army to the front. The major war boats carried up to 30 musketeers and were armed with 6- or 12-pounder cannon. By the mid-18th century, the navy had acquired a few seafaring ships, manned by European and foreign sailors.

Military history of Thai armed forces

Reform

In 1852, the Royal Siamese Armed Forces came into existence as permanent force at the behest of King Mongkut, who needed a European trained military force to thwart any western threat and any attempts at colonialisation. By 1887, during the next reign of King Chulalongkorn, a permanent military command in the Kalahom Department was established. However the office of Kalahom and the military of Siam had existed since the days of the Sukhothai Kingdom in the 13th century.

Types of uniforms

See also
 Military history of Thailand
 History of Thailand
 Burmese–Siamese wars
 Siamese–Vietnamese wars

References

 Royal Siamese forces
1238 establishments in Asia
1852 disestablishments in Siam